The 17th annual Jogja-NETPAC Asian Film Festival was held from 26 November to 3 December 2022. Indonesian anthology film Piknik Pesona was selected to open the festival. Japanese drama film Plan 75 was the closing film of the festival.

The most prestigious award of the festival, Golden Hanoman Award, was presented to Indonesian thriller film Autobiography, directed by Makbul Mubarak.

Juries
The following juries were named for the festival.

Main competition
Gertjan Zuilhof, Dutch film festival programmer
Silvia Wong, journalist
Timo Tjahjanto, Indonesian filmmaker

NETPAC Award
Djenar Maesa Ayu, Indonesian actress
Wong Tuck Cheong, owner and operator of Kelab Seni Filem Malaysia
Koyo Yamashita, Japanese festival director

Blencong Award
Rachel Amanda Aurora, Indonesian actress
Teddy Soeriaatmadja, Indonesian film director
Ho Yuhang, Malaysian film director

Indonesian Screen Awards
Sandeep Ray, writer, visual artist and historian
Mat Kesting, film curator
Elvert Bañares, film director

Geber Awards
Angger Nugroho, film producer
Sugar Nadia Azier, film program manager
Andhika Prayogo, film critic and content creator

Student Awards
I Gede Agung Yohana Dharma
Muhammad Fadjrin Rasendryo Abrar
Mohammad Ziddan Fachrirobi
Muhammad Ghifari Fadhlissalam
Albertus Nico Wicaksono

Official selection
The official selection of the festival was announced during a press conference on 18 November 2022.

Opening and closing films

In competition

Light of Asia

Indonesian Screen Awards

Panorama

Asian Perspectives

Awards
The following awards were presented at the festival:
Golden Hanoman Award: Autobiography by Makbul Mubarak
Silver Hanoman Award: Leonor Will Never Die by Martika Ramirez Escobar
NETPAC Award: Let Me Hear It Barefoot by Riho Kudo
NETPAC Award – Special Mention: 24 by Royston Tan
JAFF Indonesian Screen Awards:
Best Film: The Exiles by Lola Amaria
Best Directing: Adriyanto Dewo for Galang
Best Performance: Orsila Murib for Orpa and Rafli Anwar Mursadad for Sound from the Sea
Best Cinematography: Yudi Datau for Sound from the Sea
Best Editing: Yuda Kurniawan for The Tone Wheels
Best Storytelling: Tumpal Tampubolon for Galang
Geber Award: Leonor Will Never Die by Martika Ramirez Escobar
Blencong Award: The Intrusion by Eden Junjung
Blencong Award – Special Mention: Falling Day by Kyung Seo Park
Jogja Students Film Award: The Intrusion by Eden Junjung

References

External links

The 17th JAFF catalogue

2022 film festivals
November 2022 events in Indonesia
December 2022 events in Indonesia